Coplay Cement Company Kilns, also known as the Saylor Park Industrial Museum, is an open-air historic site located at Coplay, Pennsylvania in Lehigh County, Pennsylvania.  The nine kilns were built in 1892-1893, and used for the production of Portland cement.  They are constructed of locally produced red brick, and are known as Schoefer vertical kilns.  They were shut down in 1904.  The Coplay Cement Company donated the kilns and surrounding land to Lehigh County in 1975, for a cement industry museum.  It is operated as a partnership between the County of Lehigh, which owns and maintains the site, and the Lehigh County Historical Society, which provides educational services.  It was added to the National Register of Historic Places in 1980.

The Saylor Cement Museum honors David Saylor (1827-1884), the father of the American Portland cement industry, and the people who built this industry into one of the most important in the Lehigh Valley and the nation. Lehigh County was a natural spot for cement production. Cement is made from rocks containing lime, silica, and alumina; Lehigh County limestone “cement rock” contains all three ingredients.  In 1866 David O. Saylor helped found Coplay Cement Company.  In 1871, he received the first American patent for Portland cement, which is much stronger than the natural cement that had previously been produced in this country. Saylor's Portland cement built bridges, docks, jetties, roads, aqueducts, subways, and skyscrapers. By 1900 the Lehigh Valley made 72% of Portland cement produced in this country.

The first kiln at the Coplay Cement Company was a dome kiln. Dome kilns were inefficient; they had to shut down often.  In 1893 Coplay Cement built Mill B, containing the Schoefer kilns standing today. Originally enclosed in a large building, Schoefer kilns could run continuously.  Soon, however, the even more efficient rotary kilns came into use.  Mill B's outdated Schoefer kilns shut down in 1904, and Coplay Cement later used Mill B's buildings for storage.

References

External links

Saylor Park Industrial Museum website
The Saylor Kilns at the Historical Marker Database
Master's Thesis Discussing the Kilns' History

Industrial buildings and structures on the National Register of Historic Places in Pennsylvania
Historic American Engineering Record in Pennsylvania
Industrial buildings completed in 1893
Museums in Lehigh County, Pennsylvania
Industry museums in Pennsylvania
National Register of Historic Places in Lehigh County, Pennsylvania